Frederick Archibald Adams (April 1, 1882 – February 10, 1941) was an American politician in the state of Washington. He served in the Washington House of Representatives. From 1919 to 1921, he was the Speaker of that body.

References

1882 births
1941 deaths
Republican Party members of the Washington House of Representatives
20th-century American politicians